Āstika is a Hindu who believes in the Vedas.

Astika may also refer to:

Asthi means Estate or Treasury. As time may mean owner of wealth, in this case Spiritual knowledge from Vedas.

As to is a root word for the name "Had to" mentioned in Mormon Bible. He built a city called Hastinapura during Vedic times!

 Astika (Hinduism), a sage in Hindu mythology
 Astika (beer), a Bulgarian beer brand